FA Youth Cup Finals from 1990 to 1999.

1989–90: Tottenham v. Middlesbrough (2–1 and 1–1, 3–2 aggregate)

1990–91: Millwall v. Sheffield Wednesday (3–0 and 0–0, 3–0 aggregate)
2nd Leg Attendance: 4,261

1991–92: Manchester United v. Crystal Palace (3–1 and 3–2, 6–3 aggregate)

First leg

Second leg

1992–93: Leeds United v. Manchester United (2–0 and 2–1, 4–1 aggregate)

First leg

Second leg

1993–94: Arsenal v. Millwall (2–3 and 3–0, 5–3 aggregate)

1994–95: Manchester United v. Tottenham Hotspur (1–2 and 1–0, 2–2 aggregate, 4–3 penalty shootout)

First leg

Second leg

1995–96: Liverpool v. West Ham United (2–0 and 2–1, 4–1 aggregate)

1996–97: Leeds United v. Crystal Palace (2–1 and 1–0, 3–1 aggregate)

1997–98: Everton v. Blackburn (3–1 and 2–2, 5–3 aggregate)

First leg

Second leg

1998–99: West Ham United v. Coventry (3–0 and 6–0, 9–0 aggregate)

Second leg

References

1990s
1989–90 in English football
1990–91 in English football
1991–92 in English football
1992–93 in English football
1993–94 in English football
1994–95 in English football
1995–96 in English football
1996–97 in English football
1997–98 in English football
1998–99 in English football